Kamasutra: Vollendung der Liebe is a 1969 film score by Innerspace Productions, an early name for the band Can. It was recorded as the soundtrack for the West German film of the same name and was released some 40 years later in 2009. The musical styles heard on the album demonstrate a temporary departure from the Krautrock sound the band was producing around that time, experimenting with styles such as South Asian music and blues rock, more in keeping with Indian setting of the film. Among their first recordings, this score, together with the band's previous soundtrack album Agilok & Blubbo, are seldom discussed by the band members. Neither have material on the band's 1970 compilation Soundtracks which consists of songs previously only heard on film soundtracks. 

Two tracks have also appeared on Can compilation albums, under different titles. "There Was A Man" was previously released in longer form on Delay 1968 as "Man Named Joe". "Indisches Panorama V" appears on The Lost Tapes as "Obscura Primavera". In both cases, these are different mixes.

While the present status of the film itself is uncertain, a surviving scene features the band performing "I'm Hiding My Nightingale" with Margarete Juvan. The track would appear as a B-side to the album's only single "Kama Sutra" (listed here as "Indisches Panorama I"). For reasons unknown, the single would only be credited to Irmin Schmidt. In 2015 "I'm Hiding My Nightingale" was covered by White Magic. This version featured Ariel Pink on guitar accompaniment and was released on the eponymous I'm Hiding My Nightingale EP.

Track listing

Personnel

There are no credentials given in the liner notes. The presumed contributors are listed below.

 Irmin Schmidt - composer
 Malcolm Mooney - vocals on "There Was A Man"
 Jaki Liebezeit - drums
 Michael Karoli - guitar
 David C. Johnson - flute
 Holger Czukay - bass
 Margarete Juvan - vocals on "I'm Hiding My Nightingale"

References

Can (band) albums
1969 soundtrack albums
Film soundtracks